The Armed Forces Special Operations Division (AFSOD) is a tri-service command of the Indian Armed Forces. The division is tasked to carry out special operations. The AFSOD draws personnel from all three special warfare branches of the Armed Forces.

Indian Army Major General A. K. Dhingra, who is a war veteran from the Para SF, was appointed in May 2019 as the first head of the AFSOD.  The division is expected to be converted into a full sized tri-service command in future.

History

Origins 
The Naresh Chandra Task Force was set up in July 2011 by National Security Advisor Shivshankar Menon to review the recommendations of the Kargil Review Committee, assess the implementation progress and further suggest new reforms related to national security. The task force was led by Naresh Chandra, retired Indian Administrative Service officer, and comprised 13other members, including Gopalaswami Parthasarathy, Air Chief Marshal Srinivasapuram Krishnaswamy (Retd), Admiral Arun Prakash (Retd), Lieutenant General V. R. Raghavan (Retd), Anil Kakodkar, K. C. Verma and V. K. Duggal. The committee conducted the first holistic review of national security since the Kargil Review Committee and submitted its classified report to Prime Minister Manmohan Singh on 23 May 2012. Among its recommendations, the Task Force recommended the creation of a  cyber command, an  aerospace command and a special operations command. All three units were proposed to be tri-service commands in order to bring the various special forces units of the military under a unified command and control structure. The AFSOD is a downsized implementation of this proposal.

The creation of the AFSOD was approved by Prime Minister Narendra Modi during the Combined Commanders' Conference at Jodhpur Air Force Station on 28 September 2018.

Initial exercises 
The division concluded its first exercise, code named 'Smelling Field', on 28 September 2019. The exercise was carried out in the district of Kutch in the state of Gujarat. The exercise was meant to help in ironing out, and subsequently addressing the challenges faced by the division. 

A second exercise, code named 'DANX-2019', was subsequently held in the Andaman and Nicobar Islands.

Organisation 
The AFSOD will function under the Integrated Defence Staff. Units from all the three special forces of the Indian Armed Forces will be stationed in the division. The division is expected to be fully operational by November 2019.

Role 
The AFSOD is expected to serve as the main organisation responsible for carrying out special operations within and outside India. They are expected to carry out missions such as targeting high-value installations and degrading the war-fighting capabilities of hostile nations. The rationale behind the creation of this division is to pool the special abilities of each of the special forces units of the Armed Forces and enable them to operate together. The division will also help in reducing operational costs, since it will enable each of the special warfare units to utilise common equipment.

Components 
The division is expected to have around 3,000 soldiers, though the exact number remains classified. The main components of the AFSOD are:

Para (Special Forces): The Para SF is the special warfare branch of the Indian Army. They will form a major portion of the AFSOD.

MARCOS: The MARCOS is the special warfare branch of the Indian Navy. It is specialised in operations in a maritime environment, although it can operate in all environments.

Garud Commando Force: The Garud Commando Force is the special warfare branch of the Indian Air Force. They are tasked to undertake missions in support of air operations. They are deployed at important military bases and assets and conduct search and rescue missions during wartime.

Other systems: The division will be given operational control of transport aircraft, specialised weapon systems and surveillance equipment.

Deployments

Jammu and Kashmir 
On 24 November 2019, the AFSOD was operationally deployed for the first time in Jammu and Kashmir to conduct counter-insurgency operations in the region.

See also 
 Integrated entities 
 Defence Planning Committee, tri-services command at policy level with NSA as its chief 
 Defence Cyber Agency, tri-services command
 Integrated Defence Staff, tri-services command at strategic level composed of MoD, MEA and tri-services staff
 Integrated Command
 Defence Space Agency, draws staff from all 3 services of Indian Armed Forces
 Strategic Forces Command
 Indian Nuclear Command Authority, Strategic Forces Command
 Special Forces of India, tri-services, R&AW and internal Security each has own units

 Assets
 List of Indian Air Force stations
 List of Indian Navy bases
 List of active Indian Navy ships
 India's overseas military bases

 Other nations
 Special Operations Forces Command (KSSO)
 Joint Special Operations Command (JSOC) 

 General concepts
 Joint warfare, general concept
 Minimum Credible Deterrence
 List of cyber warfare forces of other nations

References 

2018 establishments in India
Military units and formations established in 2018
Military units and formations of India
Special forces of India
Joint military units and formations of India